Pterostylis hildae, commonly known as the rainforest greenhood, is a species of orchid found in eastern Australia. It has a rosette of leaves and when flowering a rosette at the base of a flowering stem with a single green, white and brown flower. It is found in wet forests, including rainforest in New South Wales and Queensland.

Description
The leaves have a distinct petiole and sometimes a wavy edge. The dorsal sepal and petals are fused to form a hood or "galea" over the column and the petals and dorsal sepal have a short point on their tips which end at or near horizontal. There is a wide gap at each side of the flower between the petals and lateral sepals. Flowering occurs from March to October.

Taxonomy and naming
Pterostylis hildae was first described in 1937 by William Nicholls and the description was published in The Victorian Naturalist from a specimen collected on Tamborine Mountain. The specific epithet (hildae) honours Hilda Geissmann for her contributions to nature study in Queensland.

Distribution and habitat
The rainforest greenhood is widespread and common in wet forest and rainforest between the Atherton Tableland in Queensland and Wollongong in New South Wales.

References

External links 
 

hildae
Orchids of Queensland
Orchids of New South Wales
Plants described in 1937